Sara is a 2010 Sri Lankan Sinhala thriller film directed by Nishantha Pradeep and co-produced by G. Nandasena, Janaka Siriwardena and Rohan Wanaguru. The film was inspired by the soap opera of the same name, which was telecasted by TV Derana. It stars characters from the miniplay where Sujani Menaka and Pubudu Chathuranga in lead roles along with Maureen Charuni and Asela Jayakody. Music Composed By Shameel J. It is the 1145th Sri Lankan film in the Sinhala cinema.

Plot

Cast
 Sujani Menaka as Sara
 Pubudu Chathuranga as Denuka
 Maureen Charuni as Sara's mother
 Chandika Nanayakkara as Police Inspector
 Asanka Perera
 Asela Jayakody
 Srimal Wedisinghe
 Ananda Wickramage
 Tyrone Michael
 Damitha Saluwadana
 Premadasa Vithanage

References

2010 films
2010s Sinhala-language films